Longstocking were an America, Los Angeles-based queercore-punk band.

Formed in 1995 by singer and guitarist Tamala Poljak, the group had originally been a guitar and drums duo with Poljak and drummer, Kevin Hair. Tamala had previously been in the bands Oiler and Fleabag. The group released several singles, including a split single with Team Dresch on Sub Pop, before disbanded in 1997, just after the release of their debut album, Once Upon A Time Called Now.

After the band had broken up, one of Longstocking's songs was featured on the soundtrack of the film Fuel and was included on the Fuel Soundtrack CD, released in 1998.

After this, Tamala Poljak contributed to the collaborative project called KaraNEEDoke, a set of double 7" singles released on the Kill Rock Stars label with participants Nomy Lamm, Slim Moon, Audrey Marrs, Donna Dresch, Tracy Sawyer, formerly of Heavens to Betsy, and Tamala, with music by The Need. Tamala then formed her next band, The Automaticans, who released a split single with Team Dresch on Metal Monkey Records.
In the early 2000s, Tamala joined with Jody Bleyle of Team Dresch and Whitney Skillcorn of The Little Deaths to form Infinite Xs. The band released one recording on Chainsaw Records. Tamala has collaborated with Los Angeles punk-rock legends, Exene Cervenka and Phranc. She currently fronts a band called Naps, in Los Angeles, California and collaborates with vocalist Anna Oxygen in their band Day Moon. 

In 2021 Jealous Butcher Records re-issued Once Upon a Time Called Now and released a Longstocking compilation called Singles & Demos: 1994-1998.

Members
 Tamala Poljak - vocals, guitar
 Michelle Stevenson - guitar
 David Gomez - bass
 Sherri Solinger - drums

Discography

Albums

Once Upon a Time Called Now
This was the band's only album, released on 30 September 1997.

Track listing
 "Teenage Angst at 27"   – 2:14
 "Jehu on a Rollercoaster"  – 2:17
 "Passing the Crown"  – 2:54
 "Autobarb"     – 2:54
 "Goddess (Pt. 4)"   – 2:56
 "Radio Agony"  – 3:57
 "Not a Jerk"  – 3:30
 "Equator"  – 2:56
 "Oscar Nite"  – 2:41
 "Bus"   – 3:51

Singles
 "Will You Stay", K Records, International Pop Underground single IPU088
 "Never Nowhere", split single with Team Dresch on Sub Pop SP#0439, 1998
 "Equator", Chou-Chou Records CCR-003, 1996
 "Goddess", Atomic Gimlet AG001, 1995

Soundtracks
 Fuel Soundtrack, Arena Rock Recording Co., 1998

References

External links
 [ Longstocking at the AMG]

Punk rock groups from California
Musical groups from Los Angeles
Queercore groups